WKRM (1340 AM, "Today's Hits 1340") is a radio station broadcasting a variety hits music format. Licensed to Columbia, Tennessee, United States, the station is currently owned by Middle Tennessee Broadcasting Co., Inc. and features programming from Citadel Media, Motor Racing Network, and Premiere Radio Networks.

References

External links

KRM
Adult hits radio stations in the United States
Columbia, Tennessee